Petros Avgerinos (18th century - 19th century) was a Greek politician

Biography

He was born in Pyrgos, Elis and was related to the Avgerinos family. He was mayor of Pyrgos a number of times between 1868 and 1889.

During his term as mayor, he created the public market, the Apollo Theatre, and organised work on the Pyrgos-Katakolo railway line. He also ran a philharmonic school.

References
The first version of the article is translated and is based from the article at the Greek Wikipedia (el:Main Page)

Year of birth missing
Year of death missing
Petros
People from Pyrgos, Elis